The most isolated major summits of Europe by topographic isolation are located in the European subcontinent and its tectonic and geographic boundaries. This includes major mountain peaks of fold and fault-block mountains, and also volcanoes, located not only in the European Mainland, but also those located on lands and islands on the limits of Europe, like the North Atlantic Ocean islands of the Azores and Iceland, the Arctic Ocean islands of Jan Mayen, Svalbard archipelago and Novaya Zemlya archipelago, the Mediterranean island of Sicily, the Ural Mountains, and Mount Elbrus. The definition excludes island clearly lying on the African Plate and outside the geographic limits of Europe, like the Canaries and Madeira. The active volcano of Mount Etna is somehow on, or just outside the boundaries of the Eurasian Plate, resting on the subduction boundary where the African tectonic plate is being pushed under the Eurasian plate, but geographically is part of Europe, and is also included in the Top 10 lists.

List by topographic isolation of major peaks with elevation of more than 2,500m

 Mont Blanc, Graian Alps - ; elevation 
 Elbrus volcano, Western Caucasus - ; elevation 
 Mount Etna volcano, Island of Sicily - ; elevation 
 Musala, Rila-Rhodope massif - ; elevation 
 Mulhacén, Penibaetic System - ; elevation 
 Gerlachovský štít, Tatra Mountains - ; elevation 
 Aneto, Pyrenees Mountains - ; elevation 
 Corno Grande, Apennine Mountains - ; elevation 
 Moldoveanu Peak, Southern Carpathians - ; elevation 
 Torre Cerredo, Cantabrian Mountains - ; elevation

List by topographic isolation of major peaks with elevation of more than 2,000m

  Mont Blanc, Western Alps - ; elevation 
 Elbrus volcano, Caucasus Mountains - ; elevation 
 Galdhøpiggen, Scandinavian Peninsula - ; elevation 
 Montanha do Pico volcano, Azores islands - ; elevation 
 Mount Etna volcano, Island of Sicily - ; elevation 
 Musala, Balkan Peninsula - ; elevation 
 Kebnekaise, Scandinavian Peninsula - ; elevation 
 Hvannadalshnúkur, Öræfajökull volcano Iceland - ; elevation 
 Beerenberg volcano, Jan Mayen island - ; elevation 
 Mulhacén, Iberian Peninsula - ; elevation

List by topographic isolation of major peaks with elevation of more than 1,500m

 Mont Blanc, Alps - ; elevation 
 Elbrus volcano, Greater Caucasus - ; elevation 
 Mount Narodnaya, Prepolar Ural Mountains - ; elevation 
 Galdhøpiggen, Scandinavian Peninsula - ; elevation 
 Montanha do Pico volcano, Azores islands - ; elevation 
 Mount Yamantau, Southern Ural Mountains - ; elevation 
 Mount Kruzenshtern, Novaya Zemlya archipelago - ; elevation 
 Mount Etna volcano, Island of Sicily - ; elevation 
 Musala, Southeast Europe - ; elevation 
 Kebnekaise, Scandinavian Peninsula - ; elevation

See also
 List of European ultra-prominent peaks
 List of the highest European ultra-prominent peaks
 Southernmost glacial mass in Europe

References

 Isolated
Mountains of Europe